Castlebaldwin or Bellanagarrigeeny is a townland and small village in County Sligo, Ireland.

The castle outside the village of Castlebaldwin is a fortified 17th-century house rather than a medieval castle, with gun slits in the walls and a machicolation over the door. The walls of the castle are made from stones taken from a nunnery that was near the village. Castlebaldwin is situated near the Carrowkeel Passage Tombs.

See also
 List of towns in the Republic of Ireland

References

Further reading
 

Towns and villages in County Sligo